Warren DeHaven Westlund (August 20, 1926 – February 13, 1992) was an American rower, an Olympic gold medallist at London 1948.

Rowing
Westlund graduated from Roosevelt High School and took up rowing at the University of Washington where he rowed varsity crews. In 1948 he was the strokeman of the American boat which won the gold medal in the coxed fours event.

Career and personal
He was born in Olympia, Washington and died in Seattle aged 65. He was an automobile dealer running a Buick GMC dealership in Seattle and had been a past chairman of the Seattle Automobile Show. He was married 41 years to his wife Pauline.

External links

References

1926 births
1992 deaths
American male rowers
Rowers at the 1948 Summer Olympics
Olympic gold medalists for the United States in rowing
Medalists at the 1948 Summer Olympics